Pipra is a village in West Champaran district in the Indian state of Bihar.

Demographics
As of 2011 India census, Pipra had a population of 1307 in 260 households. Males constitute 52.2% of the population and females 47.7%. Pipra has an average literacy rate of 44.5%, lower than the national average of 74%: male literacy is 65.1%, and female literacy is 34.8%. In Pipra, 19.6% of the population is under 6 years of age.

References

Villages in West Champaran district